The 1919 Washington and Lee Generals football team represented Washington and Lee University during the 1919 college football season. The Generals competed in the South Atlantic Intercollegiate Athletic Association (SAIAA) and were coached by W. C. Raftery in his third year as head coach, compiling an 8–1 record (2–1 SAIAA). In captain Turner Bethel's final game, a win over Tulane, he "covered himself with glory as well as mud." Quarterback Jim Mattox made the field goal to upset Georgia Tech.

Fuzzy Woodruff gave W&L the championship of the South for 1919.

Schedule

Players

Line

Backfield

Subs

Coaching staff
Head coach: W. C. Raftery
Assistant coach: Ted Shultz

References

Sources
 

Washington and Lee
Washington and Lee Generals football seasons
Washington and Lee Generals football